Elkton Township is a township in Clay County, Minnesota, United States. The population was 283 at the 2000 census.

Elkton Township was named for the former abundance of elk in this region.

Geography

Demographics
As of the census of 2000, there were 283 people, 104 households, and 86 families residing in the township.  The population density was 7.8 people per square mile (3.0/km2).  There were 109 housing units at an average density of 3.0/sq mi (1.2/km2).  The racial makeup of the township was 98.94% White, 0.71% from other races, and 0.35% from two or more races. Hispanic or Latino of any race were 0.71% of the population.

There were 104 households, out of which 37.5% had children under the age of 18 living with them, 73.1% were married couples living together, 5.8% had a female householder with no husband present, and 17.3% were non-families. 15.4% of all households were made up of individuals, and 5.8% had someone living alone who was 65 years of age or older.  The average household size was 2.72 and the average family size was 3.02.

In the township the population was spread out, with 25.8% under the age of 18, 7.8% from 18 to 24, 24.4% from 25 to 44, 32.5% from 45 to 64, and 9.5% who were 65 years of age or older.  The median age was 41 years. For every 100 females, there were 96.5 males.  For every 100 females age 18 and over, there were 98.1 males.

The median income for a household in the township was $52,500, and the median income for a family was $53,472. Males had a median income of $27,500 versus $28,125 for females. The per capita income for the township was $24,312.  About 5.9% of families and 6.8% of the population were below the poverty line, including 10.4% of those under the age of eighteen and 15.4% of those 65 or over.

References

Townships in Clay County, Minnesota
Townships in Minnesota